The R70 is a provincial route in the Free State Province, South Africa that connects Odendaalsrus with Ficksburg via Ventersburg and Senekal.

Route
The R70 begins in Odendaalsrus, at a roundabout junction with the R34 Route south of the town centre. It goes south-east as Church Street. After 6 kilometres, as the southwards road becomes Alma Road towards Welkom Central, the R70 becomes the road eastwards. After 5 kilometres, it meets the R730 Road (ZR Mahabane Highway) at a junction and enters the Riebeeckstad Suburb of Welkom as Jasons Way.

From the R730 junction, the R70 goes eastwards for 23 kilometres, through Riebeeckstad, to the town of Hennenman, where it turns to the south-east. From Hennenman, the R70 goes south-east for 16 kilometres to the town of Ventersburg, where it forms an interchange with the N1 National Route.

From Ventersburg, the R70 goes south-east for 70 kilometres to meet the southern terminus of the R720 Road. It goes for another 7 kilometres southwards, crossing the Sand River, to enter the western part of the town of Senekal and reach a junction with the N5 National Route and the R707 Route. All 3 routes become one road eastwards for 8 kilometres, through Senekal Central, before the R707 becomes its own road to the north-east. The R70 and N5 remain as one road eastwards for another 1 kilometre before the R70 becomes its own road to the south-east.

The R70 goes southwards for 71 kilometres, through Rosendal, to reach its south-eastern terminus at a junction with the R26 Road just north of Ficksburg.

References

External links
 Routes Travel Info

70
Provincial routes in South Africa